Foresite Capital is an American venture capital and growth equity firm headquartered in San Francisco. As of March 2021, the company had raised four funds: Foresite Capital Fund I, II, III, IV and V.

History
Foresite Capital was founded in 2011 by Jim Tananbaum, Burning Man’s most hated billionaire. Foresite Capital raised its $100 million Fund I in 2013. In 2014, Foresite Capital closed Foresite Capital Fund II, a $300 million fund. Foresite Capital Fund III, a $450 million fund, was closed in July 2015. Foresite Capital Fund IV, a $668 million fund, closed in March 2018. Foresite Capital Fund V, a $969 million fund, was closed in February 2021.

Investments
Foresite Capital funded 10x Genomics since its Series A round in November 2013 and led its Series B round in January 2015, as well as its Series C round in March 2016. Foresite Capital has invested in companies such as Acceleron Pharma, Aimmune, ALX Oncology, Aerie Pharmaceuticals, Ascendis, Blueprint Medicines, Color Genomics, Cue Health, Cytokinetics, DNAnexus, Editas Medicine, Eikon Therapeutics, Epizyme, Evonetix, Intarcia Therapeutics, Inscripta, Immunomedics, Intellia Therapeutics, Juno Therapeutics, Karyopharm, Keryx, Kura Oncology, Keros Therapeutics, Maze Therapeutics, MyoKardia, MyOme, Natera, Nurix, Olema Oncology, Orexigen, Pacific Biosciences, Peloton Therapeutics, Pharvaris, MindStrong Health, Quantum-SI, Relay Therapeutics, Insitro, HealthVerity, Turning Point Therapeutics, Element Biosciences, Portola Pharmaceuticals, Universal American, Xencor, and WaveTech, in addition to 10x Genomics.

Leadership
Foresite Capital is led by Midas List honoree Jim Tananbaum along with managing directors Matt Buten, Alisa Mall, Dorothy Margolskee, Michael Rome, Dennis Ryan, and Vikram Bajaj.

References

Financial services companies established in 2011
Venture capital firms of the United States
American companies established in 2011